EudraCT (European Union Drug Regulating Authorities Clinical Trials) is the European Clinical Trials Database of all clinical trials of investigational medicinal products with at least one site in the European Union commencing 1 May 2004 or later. The EudraCT database has been established in accordance with Directive 2001/20/EC. The EudraCT Number is unique and is needed on other documents relating to the trials (e.g. SUSAR reports).

Public Side

The public side of EudraCT is for organisations to register any of their clinical trials as defined by Directive 2001/20/EC. The process of applying and registering a clinical trial should be completed before submitting an application to any of the Member State/s in which they anticipate running the trial. The public side of EudraCT does not save any of the trial detail entered by the user, and instead provides a saved data file in the form of an XML which the user must store on their own local hard drive.

Applying for an EudraCT Number

Application for an EudraCT number is made via the EudraCT website. To generate the EudraCT number some basic information about the requestor's organisation and the trial is required:

 Requestor's organisation name, town/city and country.
 Sponsor's protocol number.
 Requestor name.
 E-mail to which the EudraCT number will be sent.
 Security code.
 Whether the clinical trial is contained in a Paediatric Investigation Plan (PIP).
 Whether the clinical trial will be conducted in a third country (outside of the EU/EEA).
 The Member States where it is anticipated that the trial will be run.

Once the requestor submits the form, the EudraCT Number will be assigned and an e-mail called "EudraCT Receipt" sent. The EudraCT number has the format YYYY-NNNNNN-CC, where:

 YYYY is the year in which the number is issued.
 NNNNNN is a six digit sequential number.
 CC is a check digit.

The Clinical Trial Application (CTA) form is also created via the EudraCT system.

Version details

The EudraCT database is currently on Version 9.

Current Versions
Version 9 of EudraCT was released in November 2013.

New features for Version 9 include:

Protocol-related information

Sponsors can: 
 Create, save XML/PDF files of clinical trial applications locally. 
 Load locally saved clinical trial applications to complete, validate, compare, or to prepare a package for submission to a National Competent Authority.

PIP addressees can:

 Create, save XML/PDF files of third country files locally.  
 Create and post third country files to the EudraCT database.  
 Load locally saved third country files to complete, validate or post to the EudraCT database. To post third country files you will need to be registered as a PIP addressee.

Result-related information
 To use result related functionality you will need to be registered as a results user, and log in. 
Results users can: 
 Create, update, validate and post result data sets, and load summary attachments to the EudraCT database. 
 Save locally XML/PDF files of result data sets. 
 Upload XML files.

Member States

Source

See also 

 European Medicines Agency
 EUDRANET
 EudraGMP
 EudraPharm
 EudraVigilance

External links 
EudraCT
EudraCT Supporting Documentation
EudraCT FAQ
International Standard Randomised Controlled Trial Number Register (ISRCTN)
 EU Clinical Trials Register (EU-CTR)

European clinical research
Clinical data management
Health and the European Union